William Wall (1836–1884) was a member of the Wisconsin State Assembly.

Biography
Wall was born on May 9, 1836. During the American Civil War, he served with the 21st Wisconsin Volunteer Infantry Regiment of the Union Army, achieving the rank of captain. Wall married Caroline Hewitt (1838–1880). He died four years after his wife at the age of 48 on June 2, 1884. Their grave is in Oshkosh, Wisconsin.

Assembly career
Wall was a member of the Assembly during the 1879, 1880 and 1881 sessions. He was a Republican.

References

1836 births
1884 deaths
Republican Party members of the Wisconsin State Assembly
People of Wisconsin in the American Civil War
Union Army officers
19th-century American politicians